Heptagenia is a genus of flatheaded mayflies in the family Heptageniidae. There are at least 20 described species in Heptagenia.

Species
These 27 species belong to the genus Heptagenia:

 Heptagenia adaequata McDunnough, 1924 i c g
 Heptagenia chinensis Ulmer, 1920 c g
 Heptagenia culacantha Evans, Botts and Flowers, 1985 i c g
 Heptagenia dalecarlica Bengtsson, 1912 c g
 Heptagenia dolosa Traver, 1935 i c g
 Heptagenia elegantula (Eaton, 1885) i c g b
 Heptagenia flava Rostock, 1878 c g
 Heptagenia flavata Navás, 1922 c g
 Heptagenia flavescens (Walsh, 1862) i c g b
 Heptagenia guranica Belov, 1981 c g
 Heptagenia joernensis g
 Heptagenia julia Traver, 1933 i c g
 Heptagenia kyotoensis Gose, 1963 c g
 Heptagenia longicauda (Stephens, 1836) c g
 Heptagenia marginalis Banks, 1910 i c g b
 Heptagenia nubila Kimmins, 1937 c g
 Heptagenia patoka Burks, 1946 i c g
 Heptagenia pectoralis Matsumura, 1931 c g
 Heptagenia perflava Brodsky, 1930 c g
 Heptagenia pulla (Clemens, 1913) i c g
 Heptagenia quadripunctata Kluge, 1989 c g
 Heptagenia samochai (Demoulin, 1973) c g
 Heptagenia solitaria McDunnough, 1924 i c g b
 Heptagenia sulphurea (Müller, 1776) c g
 Heptagenia townesi Traver, 1935 i c g
 Heptagenia traverae Braasch, 1986 c g
 Heptagenia whitingi Webb and McCafferty in Webb, Sun, McCafferty and Ferris, 2007 i c g

Data sources: i = ITIS, c = Catalogue of Life, g = GBIF, b = Bugguide.net

References

Further reading

External links

 

Mayfly genera